Cagayan, officially the Province of Cagayan, is a province in the Philippines located in the Cagayan Valley region, covering the northeastern tip of Luzon. Its capital is the city of Tuguegarao. The province borders Ilocos Norte and Apayao to the west, and Kalinga and Isabela to the south.

Cagayan was one of the early provinces that existed during the Spanish colonial period. Called La Provincia de Cagayan, its borders essentially covered the entire Cagayan Valley, which included the present provinces of Isabela, Quirino, Nueva Vizcaya, Batanes and portions of Kalinga, Apayao, and Aurora. The former capital was Nueva Segovia, which also served as the seat of the Diocese of Nueva Segovia. Today, only  remain of the former vastness of the province. The entire region, however, is still referred to as Cagayan Valley.

Etymology
A folk legend holds that the name was originally derived from the tagay, a plant that grows abundantly in the northern part of the province. The term Catagayan, "the place where the tagay grows" was shortened to Cagayan. Linguists, however, hold that cagayan comes from an ancient, lost word that means "river". Variations of this word—karayan, kayan, kayayan, and kalayan—all mean river.

History

Pre-colonial period
Cagayan has a prehistoric civilization with rich and diverse culture. According to archaeologists, the earliest man in the Philippines probably lived in Cagayan thousands of years ago. Pieces of evidence
to this effect are now convincing beyond scientific doubt to consider it as an incontestable fact.

In the classical era, Gattaran and Lal-lo used to be the home of hunter-gatherers who specialized in hunting mollusks. These hunter-gatherers have stockpiled their leftover mollusk shells in numerous sites in Gattaran and Lal-lo, until eventually, the shells formed into the largest stock of shell-midden sites in the entire Philippines.

From available evidence, the Atta or Negritos - short dark-skinned nomads - were the first people in Cagayan. They were later moved to the uplands by the Austronesians who eventually became the Ibanags, Itawes, Yogads, Gaddangs, Irayas and Malawegs - the natives of Cagayan - who actually came from one ethnicity. These are the people found by the Spaniards in the different villages along the rivers all over Cagayan. The Spaniards rightly judged that these various villagers came from a single racial stock and decided to make the Ibanag language the lingua franca, both civilly and ecclesiastically for the entire people of Cagayan which they called collectively as the Cagayanes which later was transliterated to become Cagayanos.

Cagayan was a major site for the Maritime Jade Road, one of the most extensive sea-based trade networks of a single geological material in the prehistoric world, operating for 3,000 years from 2000 BCE to 1000 CE.

Even before the Spaniards came to Cagayan, the Cagayanos have already made contact with various civilizations like the Chinese, Japanese and even Indians, as evidenced by various artifacts and even the presence of minor to moderate foreign linguistic elements in the languages of the natives.

Various other racial strains, mainly the Ilocanos, Pangasinenses, Kapampangans and Tagalogs, as well as Visayans, Moros and even foreigners like the Chinese, Indians, Arabs, Spaniards and others were further infused to the native Cagayanes to become the modern Cagayano that we know today.

Cagayan is also the site of a Wokou state when the Japanese pirate-lord Tay Fusa, set up his Japanese pirate kingdom in Cagayan before it was destroyed during the 1582 Cagayan battles.

Spanish colonial period
In 1581, Captain Ivan Sabala arrived in Cagayan with a hundred fully equipped soldiers and their families by order of Gonzalo Ronquillo de Peñaloza, the fourth Spanish Governor-General of the Philippines. The expeditionary force was sent to explore the Cagayan Valley, to convert the natives to Catholicism, and to establish ecclesiastical missions and towns throughout the valley.

On June 29, 1583, Spanish conquistador Juan de Salcedo traced the northern coastline of Luzon and set foot on the Massi (Pamplona), Tular, and Aparri areas.

La Provincia de Cagayan
In 1583, through a Spanish Royal Decree, the entire northeastern portion of Luzon (specifically, all territories east of the Cordillera mountains and those north of the Caraballo mountains) including the islands in the Balintang Channel were organized into one large political unit called the La Provincia de Cagayan. The provincia'''s territorial delineation encompassed the present provinces of Batanes, Isabela, Quirino, Nueva Vizcaya, including portions of Kalinga, Apayao, and Aurora. Its capital was Nueva Segovia (the present municipality of Lal-lo).

The Spanish friars soon established mission posts in Camalaniugan and Lal-lo (Nueva Segovia), which became the seat of the Diocese established by Pope Clement VIII on August 14, 1595.

A founding population of 200 Spanish citizens from Europe accompanied by 100 Spanish soldiers set up settlements across Cagayan Valley. These people were in turn supplemented by 155 Latin American soldiers recruited from Mexico.

The see was moved in 1758 to Vigan because of its relative distance. The Spanish influence can still be seen in the massive churches and other buildings that the Spaniards built for the spiritual and social welfare of the people.

In 1839, Nueva Vizcaya was established as a politico-military province and was separated from Cagayan. Later, Isabela was founded as a separate province on May 1, 1856, its areas carved from southern Cagayan and eastern Nueva Vizcaya territories.

During the late 18th century, the New Spain government encouraged the expansion of trade and development of commodity crops. Among these was tobacco, and lands in Cagayan became the center of a vertically integrated monopoly: tobacco was grown there and shipped to Manila, where it was processed and made into cigarettes and cigars. The development of the related bureaucracy and accounting systems was done under the leadership of José de Gálvez, who as visitor-general to Mexico from 1765 to 1772 developed the monopoly there and increased revenues to the Crown. He worked in the Philippines as Minister of the Indies from 1776 to 1787, constructing a similar monopoly there under Governor-General Basco y Vargas (1778–1787). The Spanish development of this industry affected all their economic gains in the Philippines.

The establishment of the civil government of Cagayan through the 1583 Spanish Royal Decree is commemorated in the annual Aggao Nac Cagayan celebrations of the Provincial Government of Cagayan and its people.

American period
When the Treaty of Paris was signed in 1898, ending the Spanish–American War, the United States took over the Philippines. It influenced the culture, most notably in agriculture and education, as well as in public works and communications. A naval base also increased interaction between local Filipinos and American sailors and administrators. At the close of the 18th century, there were 29 municipalities in the province of Cagayan. After the Philippines came under American sovereignty in 1902, more municipalities were founded. Since then, due to centralization and shifting of populations, the number of municipalities is back to 29. A new wave of immigration began in the late 19th and 20th centuries with the arrival of another group of the Ilocano settlers who came in large numbers. They now constitute the largest group in the province, and it was only in this large-scale Ilocano immigration & settlement that made Ilocano language replaced Ibanag as the lingua franca of the province.

World War II

During the Second World War, with air raids by Japanese fighters and bombers, the province of Cagayan suffered much destruction by bombing and later invasion. Japanese Imperial forces entered Cagayan in 1942. While under the Japanese Occupation, several pre-war infantry divisions and regular units of the Philippine Commonwealth Army were re-established during the period on January 3, 1942, to June 30, 1946. They established general headquarters, camps and garrisoned troops in the province of Cagayan, and began operations against the Japanese Occupation forces in the Cagayan Valley. This included sending troops to the provinces of Cagayan and Isabela, and helping the local soldiers of the 11th and 14th Infantry Regiment of the USAFIP-NL, the local guerrilla fighters and the U.S. liberation forces. They fought against the Japanese Imperial forces from 1942 to 1945.

The Battle off Cape Engaño on October 26, 1944, was held off Cape Engaño. At that time American carrier forces attacked the Japanese Northern Force. This became the concluding action of the Battle of Leyte Gulf. The Japanese lost 4 carriers, 3 light cruisers and 9 destroyers.

In 1945, the combined United States and Philippine Commonwealth ground troops, together with the recognized guerrillas, took Cagayan. Part of the action were the Filipino soldiers of the 1st, 2nd, 12th, 13th, 15th and 16th Infantry Division of the Philippine Commonwealth Army, 1st Constabulary Regiment of the Philippine Constabulary and the 11th and 14th Infantry Regiment of the United States Armed Forces in the Philippines – Northern Luzon or USAFIP-NL from the Battle of Cagayan Valley during the Second World War.

Post-war era
During the 1970s and 1980s, Cagayan became known as a bailiwick of Juan Ponce Enrile of Gonzaga, who as Secretary and later Minister of National Defense became one of the most powerful figures during the Martial Law period under President Ferdinand Marcos. His influence enabled the construction of Port Irene, a modernized international harbor facility in Santa Ana that was named after Marcos' daughter Irene, which later formed the basis for the creation of the Cagayan Special Economic Zone and Freeport, whose enabling law was authored by Enrile as a Senator in 1995 and now includes Santa Ana and parts of Aparri. Despite Enrile's defection in the 1986 EDSA People Power Revolution, Cagayan remained as one of the few bastions of Marcos supporters in the so-called "Solid North" region of northern Luzon. However, this did not prevent the province from being one of the hotbeds of the NPA rebellion starting in the 1970s. During that time, logging concessions were awarded in the province by the Marcoses to Enrile and other cronies, leading to the severe degradation of forest cover in the province that contributed to widespread flooding and other environmental issues that persist today.

Cagayan was also the site of the Hotel Delfino Siege in Tuguegarao, which took place on March 4, 1990, when efforts to arrest suspended governor Rodolfo Aguinaldo for supporting rebellions against the government of President Corazon Aquino led to him storming the provincial capital and taking hostages including his would-be arresting officer, Brigadier General Oscar Florendo of the Armed Forces of the Philippines Civil Relations Service. The stand-off deteriorated into a series of gun-battles throughout the town, with Florendo being killed presumably in a crossfire inside the hotel and Aguinaldo managing to escape and go into hiding before later surrendering and being cleared of legal charges by winning reelection in 1992.

Geography

Situated within the Cagayan Valley region, the province is bounded by the Philippine Sea on the east; on the south by Isabela province; on the west by the Cordillera Mountains; and on the north by the Balintang Channel and the Babuyan Group of Islands. About  from the northeastern tip of the province is the island of Palaui; a few kilometers to the west is Fuga Island.

The eastern coast forms the northern portion of the Sierra Madre mountain range, while the western limits are generally hilly to low in elevation. The central area, dominated by a large valley, forms the lower basin of the country's longest river, the Cagayan. The mouth is located at the northern town of Aparri.

Administrative divisions
Cagayan comprises 28 municipalities and one city divided into three congressional districts. It has 820 barangays. Tuguegarao City (as of December 18, 1999) is the provincial capital, regional seat, and center of business, trade, and education and the only city in the province.

Barangays
The 28 municipalities and 1 city of the province comprise a total of 820 barangays, with Ugac Sur in Tuguegarao City as the most populous in 2010, and Centro 15 (Poblacion) in Aparri as the least. If cities are excluded, Maura in Aparri has the highest population.

Climate
Cagayan has a tropical savannah climate (Aw) with hot days and warm nights that last year round.

Demographics

The majority of people living in Cagayan are of Ilocano descent, mostly from migrants coming from the Ilocos Region. Originally, the more numerous groups were the Ibanags, who were first sighted by the Spanish explorers and converted to Christianity by missionaries, the reason why the Ibanag language had spread throughout the valley region prior to the arrival of the migrating Ilocanos. Cagayan is predominantly Roman Catholic with 85% of the population affiliated and the Aglipayan Church has a very strong minority in the province.

Aside from Ilocanos and Ibanags, Malawegs, Itawits, Gaddangs, groups of nomadic Aetas, as well as families of Ibatans who have assimilated into the Ibanag-Ilocano culture make Cagayan their home. More recently, a new group from the south, the Muslim Filipinos, have migrated to this province and have made a community for themselves. In addition to this, Tagalog-speaking peoples from Central Luzon and Southern Luzon have also settled in the area, as well as a few Pangasinans and Kapampangans from the central plains.

Major languages spoken are Ilocano followed by Ibanag, Yogad and Gaddang. Ilocanos and Ibanags speak Ilocano with an Ibanag accent, as descendants of Ilocanos from first generation in Cagayan who lived within Ibanag population learned Ibanag; same situation with Ilocano tinged by Gaddang, Paranan, Yogad, and Itawis accents when descendants of Ilocanos from first generation in Cagayan who lived within Gaddang, Paranan, Yogad, and Itawis populations learned their languages. People especially in the capital and commercial centers speak and understand English and Tagalog/Filipino. Tagalogs, Ilocanos, and Ibanags speak Tagalog with an Ibanag accent, as descendants of Tagalogs from first generation in Cagayan who lived within Ibanag population learned Ibanag.

Endangered languages
There are two endangered indigenous languages in Cagayan. These are the Dupaninan Agta language (with fewer than 1400 remaining speakers) and the Central Cagayan Agta language (with fewer than 799 remaining speakers); both of these are listed as Vulnerable according to the UNESCO Atlas of the World's Endangered Languages. All remaining speakers of the languages are among the community's elders. Without a municipality-wide teaching mechanism of the two endangered languages for the youth where the languages are present, the languages may be extinct within 3-5 decades, making them languages in grave peril unless a teaching-mechanism is established by either the government or an educational institution in the municipalities of Gattaran and Baggao.

Economy

Agricultural products are rice, corn, peanut, beans, and fruits. Livestock products include cattle, hogs, carabaos, and poultry. Fishing various species of fish from the coastal towns is also undertaken. Woodcraft furniture made of hardwood, rattan, bamboo, and other indigenous materials are also available in the province.

The Northern Cagayan International Airport, in Lal-lo, was built to support the Cagayan Special Economic Zone in northern Cagayan, which also serves seaborne traffic through Port Irene. The airport project involved the construction of a 2,200-meter runway, with a width of 45 meters, following the standards of the International Civil Aviation Organization. Completed in October 2014, the international airport can accommodate large aircraft such as the Airbus A319-100 and Boeing regional jets of comparable size.

Tourism
Since Cagayan faces the Philippine Sea, an extensive shoreline sprawls along the northern coastal towns of Sanchez Mira, Pamplona, Santa Praxedes, Claveria, Buguey, Aparri, Ballesteros, Abulug, and the islands of Palaui, Fuga, and island municipality of Calayan. Sanchez Mira, Claveria, and Santa Praxedes have facilities for excursion stays while Fuga Island is being developed as a world-class recreation and tourism center. Activities include whale watching at the Calayan Islands, and scuba diving, snorkeling and fishing in Palaui Island of Santa Ana. The airstrip at Claveria could be used as a jump-off point to Fuga Island.

The Sambali Festival is celebrated throughout the province in commemoration of its founding. Hotels include the Governors Garden Hotel, Hotel Candice, Hotel Roma and Hotel Kimikarlai all in Tuguegarao City.

Claveria is host to several scenic attractions which include: the Lakay-Lakay Lagoon, the rocky formation along the Camalaggaon Caves, the Roadside Park overlooking the Claveria Bay, Macatel Falls with its clear waters that run in abundance throughout the year, the Pata Lighthouse'', and the Claveria Beach Resort along the white sand coasts.

Notable personalities

Bretman Rock - beauty influencer and social media personality. From Sanchez Mira, Cagayan. 
 Kakai Bautista - actress and comedian.
 Paco Román -  Filipino-Spanish soldier and later became a revolutionary during Philippine Revolution and Philippine–American War. Roman had the rank of a colonel in the revolutionary army, and served as the close aide of General Antonio Luna. From Alcala, Cagayan.
 Cesar Adib Majul - Philippine historian best known for his work on the history of Islam in the Philippines and on the life of Apolinario Mabini.
 Salvador Lazo Lazo - Filipino prelate of the Roman Catholic Church. He served as Bishop of San Fernando de La Union from 1981 to 1993.
 Ricardo Baccay - third Bishop of the Diocese of Alaminos, Pangasinan and former Auxiliary Bishop of the Archdiocese of Tuguegarao. Born in Tuguegarao.
 Eulogio Balao - former Secretary of the Department of National Defense and former Senator of the Republic of the Philippines, from Tuguegarao City.
 Diosdado P. Banatao - entrepreneur and engineer working in the high-tech industry. From Iguig, Cagayan.
 Lilia Cuntapay - An actress, also known as the "Queen of Philippine Horror Films", from Gonzaga, Cagayan.
 Maja Ross Andres Salvador - a popular actress of ABS-CBN, born and raised in barangay Canayun, Abulug, Cagayan.
Silvestre Bello III - secretary of the Department of Labor and Employment from Gattaran, Cagayan.
Arthur Tugade - secretary of the Department of Transportation from Claveria, Cagayan.
 Juan Ponce Enrile - cabinet secretary and minister under Presidents Ferdinand Marcos (Finance, Justice and Defense) and Corazon Aquino (Defense), Senator (1987-1992, 1995-2001, 2004–2016) and President of the Senate of the Philippines (2008-2013), from Gonzaga, Cagayan

See also 
 Callao Man
 Our Lady of Piat
 Malaueg Church
 Roman Catholic Archdiocese of Tuguegarao
 Lal-lo and Gattaran Shell Middens

References

External links

 
 
 
 Official Website of the Provincial Government of Cagayan

 
Provinces of the Philippines
Provinces of Cagayan Valley
States and territories established in 1583
1583 establishments in the Philippines